Jan Kuczyński (7 January 1935 – 28 November 2009) was a Polish wrestler. He competed in the men's freestyle lightweight at the 1960 Summer Olympics.

References

1935 births
2009 deaths
Polish male sport wrestlers
Olympic wrestlers of Poland
Wrestlers at the 1960 Summer Olympics
Sportspeople from Vilnius
People from Wilno Voivodeship (1926–1939)